Carlos Gustavo Castillo Mattasoglio (born 28 February 1950) is Peruvian prelate of the Catholic Church whom Pope Francis named Archbishop of Lima on 25 January 2019.

Early career
Carlos Castillo Mattasoglio was born in Lima on 28 February 1950. After attending the Dalton de Lince College and the San Agustín College of Lima, he studied at the National University of San Marcos from 1968 to 1973, earning a bachelor's degree in social sciences. At San Marcos, he joined the National Union of Catholic Students, led by Father Gustavo Gutiérrez, one of the principal voices in the Liberation Theology movement. He continued his studies at the Santo Toribio di Mogrovejo major seminary in Lima. At the Pontifical Gregorian University in Rome he earned a bachelor's degree in philosophy in 1979 and in theology in 1983. He was ordained a priest on 15 July 1984 by Cardinal Juan Landázuri Ricketts. He obtained a licentiate and a doctorate in dogmatic theology in 1985 and 1987 at the Gregorian.

He was assessor of the National Union of Catholic Students from 1987 to 1998; vicar of various parishes from 1987 to 1991, and then an associate in parish work from 1991 to 1999, and a vicar again from 1999 to 2015. He headed university pastoral care in Lima in the 1990s and a variety of archdiocesan posts with responsibility for youth and vocational pastoral care from 1996 to 1999. On the national level, he was assessor of the Commission for Youth of the Peruvian Episcopal Conference from 1990 to 2001. He was director of relations with the Church and member of the University Council of the Pontifical Catholic University of Peru from 2003 to 2006.

Archbishop

Pope Francis named him to succeed Juan Luis Cipriani Thorne as Archbishop of Lima on 25 January 2019. As Archbishop he is ex officio Grand Chancellor of the Faculty of Civil and Canon Theology of Lima. When named archbishop, he was a lecturer in theology–a position he had held since 1987–and assessor of the Center for University Pastoral Assistance at the Pontifical Catholic University of Peru. He also assisted in parish work at Church of San Francisco Solano. In addition to Spanish, he speaks Italian and French.

Cipriani said Castillo's appointment should not be interpreted politically as an expression of support for the Pontifical University or liberation theology, or disrespect for Opus Dei. But Austen Ivereigh called it "an ecclesial earthquake". Without naming Cipriani, Cardinal Pedro Barreto said Castillo's appointment "brings the Peruvian conference of bishops much closer to the reality of the church of which we all dream, a church that is poor and for the poor, a church that reaches out, a church that is closer to those who are suffering now." John L. Allen Jr., citing the differences between Cipriani and Castillo on liberation theology and the Pontifical University, wrote that "it's still fairly unusual to see a cardinal's legacy disassembled in real time quite like this".

His consecration and installation ceremony was held on 2 March 2019. He was consecrated by the apostolic nuncio Nicola Girasoli, with Cardinals Cipriani and Pedro Barreto, Archbishop Héctor Miguel Cabrejos Vidarte and Bishop Luis Bambarén Gastelumendi serving as the principal co-consecrators. During the ceremony the liberation theologian, Gustavo Gutiérrez, speaking as representative of the church of Lima, formally called upon the papal nuncio to ordain Father Castillo Mattasoglio as bishop.

Writings
His principal works include:
 Libres para creer, la conversión según Bartolomé de Las Casas en la Historia de las Indias, Fondo Editorial PUCP, 1993.
 Teologia della rigenerazione, EMI, 2001.
 La opción por los jóvenes en Aparecida, CEP-IPADEJ-IBC, 2008.
 Joven, a ti te digo ¡levántate!, 2009.
 Caminando en el amor. El pastor de una Iglesia viva. Homenaje al cardenal Juan Landázuri Ricketts en el centenario de su nacimiento (editor), Fondo Editorial PUCP, 2014.

References

External links

1950 births
Bishops appointed by Pope Francis
Living people
People from Lima
Pontifical Gregorian University alumni
Peruvian theologians
National University of San Marcos alumni
Roman Catholic archbishops of Lima